Little Hoole is a civil parish in the South Ribble district of Lancashire, England.  It contains two listed buildings that are recorded in the National Heritage List for England.  Both of the listed buildings are designated at Grade II, the lowest of the three grades, which is applied to "buildings of national importance and special interest".  The parish contains the village of Walmer Bridge, and is otherwise rural,  The listed buildings comprise a former manor house and a farmhouse, both dating from the 17th century.


Buildings

References

Citations

Sources

Lists of listed buildings in Lancashire
Buildings and structures in South Ribble